Julie 2 is a Hindi-language erotic thriller film written, co-produced and directed by Deepak Shivdasani and produced by Vijay Nair. It features Raai Laxmi which marks her debut in Hindi cinema. This is the sequel to Shivdasani's earlier film Julie (2004).

Viju Shah composes the film's score and soundtrack while Sameer Reddy handles the cinematography. Principal photography commenced in September 2015. Filming locations include Mumbai, Hyderabad and Dubai. The film's first look poster was released on 14 February 2016 coinciding with Valentine's Day.

The film was released on 24 November 2017.

Plot 
A wanna be actress Julie (Raai) struggles through sleazy innuendos before caving in and getting embroiled in the shadowy world that purportedly finances the film industry. Her first love Mohit abandons her at the first sign of trouble while her second (Ravi Kisshen) uses her and moves on to his next conquest. The third one is Dubai Don Lala (Dev Gill) and her fourth a cricketer who thinks she won't suit the sati savitri image his parents expect of his bride. So that leaves Julie in a huddle and egged on by her woman Friday, Annie (Rati Agnihotri) she chooses Jesus – only to be gunned down the day after her symbolic baptism.

The rest of the film has a ferocious looking ACP Dev Dutt (Aditya Srivastava) trying to arrive at a decent enough reason for her murder. Of course, the power broker with CM aspirations and a dead wife who looks like Julie's doppelganger, may have something to do with it.

Cast
 Raai Laxmi as Julie / Sumitra Devi 
 Nishikant Kamat as Film Director Mohit
 Dev Gill as Atif Lala
 Ravi Kishan as Ravi Kumar
 Asad Raza Khan as Ambani
 Aditya Srivastava as ACP Dev Dutt
 Pankaj Tripathy as Ashwin Asthana
 Rati Agnihotri as Annie Aunty
 Yuri Suri as Julie's father

Production
Initially Paoli Dam was approached for the titular role after her success in Hate Story but she refused as she did not want to be stereotype. In July 2015, Raai Laxmi was signed by Deepak Shivdasani for the sequel to his film Julie (2004). It was her first Hindi film, and 50th film as an actress.

Release and Marketing 
The first look was released on 14 February 2016. In mid October 2016 Raai Laxmi in an interview said that the film will be released in Hindi, Telugu, Tamil languages .

Soundtrack

References

External links
 
 

2017 films
2010s Hindi-language films
Indian sequel films
Films scored by Viju Shah
Indian romantic thriller films
Indian erotic thriller films
2010s erotic thriller films
2010s romantic thriller films
Films shot in Dubai
Films shot at Ramoji Film City
Films directed by Deepak Shivdasani